Raison d'être is a Swedish dark ambient project formed by Peter Andersson.
The name of the band was taken from a sentence in a book by Carl Gustav Jung: "the individuation is the raison d’être of the self".
Dark ambient atmospheres, drone elements, industrial sounds, ecclesiastical hymns are all blended together to constitute the music of Raison d'être. 

The music produced by Raison d'être is variously dark ambient and soundscape in nature. For example, synthesizers might play a droning melody over the sound of metal scraping together. Andersson often mixes tapes of Gregorian chant with his own keyboard and percussion playing.

Discography

 Après nous le Déluge  (Cassette, 1992)
 Aprés nous le Déluge  (MP3, 2008)
 Aprés nous le Déluge (Redux)  (CD, 2012)
 Prospectus I  (CD, 1993)
 Prospectus I (Re-mix)  (Cassette, 2005)
 Prospectus I (Redux)  (2xCD, 2013)
 Sakral Wounds  (VHS, 1994)
 The Ring of Isvarah  (Cassette, 1994)
 Conspectus  (Cassette, 1994)
 Enthraled by the Wind of Lonelienes  (CD, 1994)
 Enthraled by the Wind of Lonelienes (Re-mix)  (FLAC/MP3, 2007)
 Enthralled by the Wind of Loneliness (Redux)  (CD, 2013)
 Semblance  (Cassette, 1995)
 Within the Depths of Silence and Phormations  (CD, 1995)
 Within the Depths of Silence and Phormations (Redux)  (2xCD, 2013)
 In Sadness, Silence and Solitude  (CD, 1997)
 In Sadness, Silence and Solitude (Re-Issue)  (CD, 2006)
 In Sadness, Silence and Solitude (Expanded)  (2xCD, 2014)
 In Sadness, Silence and Solitude (Expanded Special Edition)  (2xCD+7", 2014)
 Reflections from the Time of Opening  (CD, 1997)
 Reflections from the Time of Opening (Re-Issue)  (CD, 2005)
 Lost Fragments  (CD-R, 1998)
 Lost Fragments  (2xCD, 2002)
 Collective Archives  (2xCD, 1999)
 The Empty Hollow Unfolds  (CD, 2000)
 The Empty Hollow Unfolds (Expanded)  (2xCD, 2014)
 The Empty Hollow Unfolds (Special Expanded)  (3xCD, 2014)
 Requiem for Abandoned Souls  (CD, 2003)
 Requiem for Abandoned Souls (Expanded  (2xCD, 2014)
 Metamorphyses  (CD, 2006)
 Metamorphyses (Expanded)  (2xCD, 2014)
 Live Archive 1  (FLAC/MP3, 2007)
 Live Archive 2  (FLAC/MP3, 2007)
 Live Archive 3  (FLAC/MP3, 2008)
 The Luminous Experience (Live in Enschede 2008)  (CD, 2008)
 The Stains of the Embodied Sacrifice (CD, 2009)
 The Stains of the Embodied Sacrifice (Expanded) (2xCD, 2012)
 The Stains of the Embodied Sacrifice (Special Expanded) (3xCD, 2012)
 Live Archive  (3xCD, 2010)
 When the Earth Dissolves in Ashes (CD, 2012)
 Collected Works (CD, 2013)
 Mise en Abyme (CD, 2014); see Mise en abyme for the meaning of this title in broader cultural terms.
 Feasting in Valhalla (CD, 2014)
 Tales from the Tabula Rasa (Early Works 1988-1991) (2xCD, 2014)
 De Aeris In Sublunaria Influxu (Troum and Raison d'Être) (CD, 2015)
 Alchymeia   (CD, 2018)

References

External links
Raison d'être official website
Peter Andersson official website
Discogs: raison d'être
Bandcamp: raison d'être

Swedish industrial music groups
Swedish electronic music groups
Musical groups established in 1992
Dark ambient music groups